Celebrating The Third Place, subtitled: Inspiring Stories About The Great Good Places at the Heart of Our Communities, is a 2001 book by Ray Oldenburg.  The book is a collage of 19 essays which tell stories of active third places in the heart of communities.

Notes
(New York: Marlowe & Company, 2001) 

Essay collections
Community building
2001 books